Carex haematosaccus is a tussock-forming species of perennial sedge in the family Cyperaceae. It is native to central and eastern parts of Madagascar.

There are town synonyms;
 Carex euryphylla Cherm. 
 Carex renschiana var. brachystachya Cherm.

See also
List of Carex species

References

haematosaccus
Plants described in 1900
Taxa named by Charles Baron Clarke
Endemic flora of Madagascar